She-Man is a 1967 American film directed by Bob Clark and starring Leslie Marlowe.

Premise
A soldier is forced to take estrogen and wear lingerie when he's blackmailed by a violent transvestite.

Cast
 Leslie Marlowe as Lt. Albert Rose / Rose Albert
 Wendy Roberts as Ruth
 Dorian Wayne as Dominique Festro / Dominita
 Crystal Hans			
 Diane O'Donnell		
 Jeff Gillen		
 Winnie Melton			
 Norman Chant			
 Virginia Jasper	
 Marilyn Denham

See also
List of American films of 1967
Queens at Heart

References

External links

1967 films
Films directed by Bob Clark
1967 comedy-drama films
American comedy-drama films
Transgender-related films
1967 LGBT-related films
1967 directorial debut films
1960s English-language films
1960s American films